The Men's trios event at the 2010 South American Games was held on March 26 at 9:00.

Medalists

Results

References
Report

Trios